Alex Martins (born January 12, 1964) is an American sports executive. He is currently the chief executive officer, of the Orlando Magic of the National Basketball Association, positions he has held since 2006. He began his career with the Magic in 1989 as the team's public relations director.

Martins also currently serves as a member of the University of Central Florida Board of Trustees. He graduated from Villanova University with his Bachelor of Science in Business Administration in 1986, and from UCF with a Master's of Business Administration (MBA) in 2001.

References

1954 births
Living people
Villanova University alumni
University of Central Florida alumni
University of Central Florida Trustees
Orlando Magic executives
American chief operating officers
American chief executives of professional sports organizations